Elwood may refer to any one of the following::

Places
In Australia
Elwood, Victoria

In the United States of America
Elwood, Illinois
Elwood, Indiana
Elwood, Kansas
Elwood, Missouri
Elwood, Nebraska
Elwood-Magnolia, New Jersey
Elwood, New York
Elwood, Utah

People
First name
Elwood Barker (1878–1953), American politician
Elwood Richard Quesada, American Air Force general
Elwood Wherry, American Presbyterian missionary

Surname
Augustus R. Elwood (1819–1881), American politician
Brian Elwood (born 1933), New Zealand public servant
Edwin L. Elwood (1847–1907), American soldier
Eric Elwood (born 1969), Irish rugby union player
James Elwood (c. 1921–2021), British physician
Jimmy Elwood (1901–1936), Irish footballer
Joey Elwood, one of the founders of Gotee Records
Paul Elwood (born 1958), American composer and banjo player
Roger Elwood (1943–2007), American science fiction writer
Sheri Elwood, Canadian screenwriter
Thomas Elwood (disambiguation), various people

Other
Elwood (American musician), a hip-hop/rock duo
Elwood (horse), 1904 Kentucky Derby winner
Elwood (dog), winner of the 2007 World's Ugliest Dog Contest
Elwood (sternwheeler), a steamboat that operated in Oregon, Washington and British Columbia
Elwood Blues, Dan Aykroyd's adopted name as a member of the blues and soul band The Blues Brothers
John Elwood Shepherd, a character from the unfinished manga Zombiepowder.
Elwood P. Dowd, main character from the play and movie Harvey

See also 
Ellwood (disambiguation)